Richard "Pete" Miller (born May 4, 1952) is an American retired basketball player and current coach.

Playing career
Miller played collegiate basketball for the San Jose State Spartans men's basketball team.
From 1975, Miller played three seasons with Nationale Nederlanden Donar in the Dutch Eredivisie. He averaged 20.4 points per game over three seasons in the Eredivisie. Later, he left to play in Germany for Bayer Leverkusen and later Bayern Munich.

Coaching career
Miller started his coaching career with Bayern Munich in 1985 and spent the next decade in Germany coaching several clubs in the Munich area.

In 2008, Miller returned to the Netherlands to coach Aris Leeuwarden. In 2010, he reached the semi-finals of the DBL with Aris.

On April 12, 2021, Miller signed as head coach of Donar for the remainder of the 2020–21 season after the club sacked Ivan Rudež. Donar was eliminated in the semifinals of the playoffs by Heroes Den Bosch.

Personal
Miller is often nicknamed "Pistol Pete".

References

Donar (basketball club) coaches
Bayer Giants Leverkusen players
Aris Leeuwarden coaches
Donar (basketball club) players
Dutch Basketball League players
American men's basketball coaches
FC Bayern Munich basketball players
FC Bayern Munich basketball coaches
1952 births
Living people